was the 36th emperor of Japan, according to the traditional order of succession.

The years of his reign lasted from 645 through 654.

Traditional narrative

He was a descendant of Emperor Bidatsu. He was a son of Chinu no ōkimi (Prince Chinu, 茅渟王) by Kibitsuhime no ōkimi (Princess Kibitsuhime, 吉備姫王). Empress Kōgyoku was his elder sister from the same parents. Chinu was a son of Prince Oshisaka hikohito no ōe, whose father was the Emperor Bidatsu. He had at least three consorts including his Empress, Hashihito no Himemiko (Princess Hashihito), the daughter of Emperor Jomei and his sister Empress Kōgyoku.  In the 3rd year of Kōgyoku-tennōs reign (皇極天皇三年), the empress abdicated; and the succession (senso) was received by her younger brother.  Shortly thereafter, Emperor Kōtoku is said to have acceded to the throne (sokui).

Kōtoku ruled from July 12, 645, until his death in 654.  In 645 he ascended to the throne two days after Prince Naka no Ōe (Emperor Tenji) assassinated Soga no Iruka in the court of Kōgyoku. Kōgyoku abdicated in favor of her son and crown prince, Naka no Ōe, but Naka no Ōe insisted Kōtoku should ascend to the throne instead. Kōtoku's contemporary title would not have been tennō, as most historians  believe this title was not introduced until the reigns of Emperor Tenmu and Empress Jitō. Rather, it was presumably Sumeramikoto or Amenoshita Shiroshimesu Ōkimi (治天下大王), meaning "the great king who rules all under heaven".  Alternatively, Kōtoku might have been referred to as (ヤマト大王/大君) or the "Great King of Yamato".  According to the Nihonshoki, he was of gentle personality and was in favor of Buddhism.

In 645 he created a new city in the area called Naniwa, and moved the capital from Yamato Province to this new city (see Nara). The new capital had a sea port and was good for foreign trade and diplomatic activities.  In 653 Kōtoku sent an embassy to the court of the Tang dynasty in China, but some of the ships were lost en route.

Naka no Ōe held the rank of crown prince and was the de facto leader of the government. In 653 Naka no Ōe proposed to move the capital again to Yamato province. Kōtoku denied. Naka no Ōe ignored the emperor's policy and moved to the former province. Many courtiers of the court, including Empress Hashihito, followed him. Kōtoku was left in the palace. In the next year he died of an illness. After his death, Naka would not ascend to the throne. Instead, his mother and the sister of Kōtoku, the former Empress Kogyoku, ascended to the throne under another name, Empress Saimei.

He enacted the Taika Reform edicts.  The system of hasshō kyakkan (eight ministries and a hundred offices) was first established during the reign of Emperor Kōtoku.

The actual site of Kōtoku's grave is known.  This emperor is traditionally venerated at a memorial Shinto shrine (misasagi) at Osaka. The Imperial Household Agency designates this location as Kōtoku's mausoleum.  It is formally named Ōsaka-no-shinaga no misasagi.

Kugyō
Kugyō (公卿) is a collective term for the very few most powerful men attached to the court of the Emperor of Japan in pre-Meiji eras.

In general, this elite group included only three to four men at a time.  These were hereditary courtiers whose experience and background would have brought them to the pinnacle of a life's career.  During Kōtoko's reign, this apex of the  Daijō-kan included: 
 Sadaijin, Abe no Kurahashi-maro (阿部倉梯麻呂) (d. 649), 645–649.
 Sadaijin, Kose no Tokoda (巨勢徳太) (593–658), 649–658.
 Udaijin, Soga no Kura-no-Yamada no Ishikawa-no-maro (蘇我倉山田石川麻呂) (d. 649), 645–649.
 Udaijin, Ōtomo no Nagatoko (大伴長徳) (d. 651), 649–651.
 Naidaijin(内臣), Nakatomi Kamako (中臣鎌子) (Fujiwara no Kamatari, 藤原鎌足) (614–669), 645–669.

Eras of Kōtoku's reign
The years of Kōtoku's reign are more specifically identified by more than one era name or nengō.
 Taika   (645–650)
 Hakuchi (650–655)

Consorts and children
Empress: Princess Hashihito (間人皇女, d. 665), Emperor Jomei and Empress Kogyoku’s daughter

Hi: Abe no Otarashi-hime (阿部小足媛), Abe no Kurahashi-maro's daughter
 Prince Arima (有間皇子, 640–658)

Hi: Saga no Chi-no-iratsume (蘇我乳娘), Soga no Kura-no-Yamada no Ishikawa-no-maro's daughter

Ancestry

See also
 Emperor of Japan
 List of Emperors of Japan
 Imperial cult

Notes

References
 Aston, William George. (1896).  Nihongi: Chronicles of Japan from the Earliest Times to A.D. 697. London: Kegan Paul, Trench, Trubner.  
 Brown, Delmer M. and Ichirō Ishida, eds. (1979).  Gukanshō: The Future and the Past. Berkeley: University of California Press. ;  
 Ponsonby-Fane, Richard Arthur Brabazon. (1959).  The Imperial House of Japan. Kyoto: Ponsonby Memorial Society. 
 Titsingh, Isaac. (1834). Nihon Ōdai Ichiran; ou,  Annales des empereurs du Japon.  Paris: Royal Asiatic Society, Oriental Translation Fund of Great Britain and Ireland.  
 Varley, H. Paul. (1980). Jinnō Shōtōki: A Chronicle of Gods and Sovereigns. New York: Columbia University Press. ;  

 
 

Japanese emperors
596 births
654 deaths
People of Asuka-period Japan
7th-century monarchs in Asia
6th-century Japanese people
7th-century Japanese monarchs
Buddhism in the Asuka period